Gilbert Edmund Kaplan (March 3, 1941 – January 1, 2016) was an American businessman and financial publisher. He was also an aficionado of the music of Gustav Mahler, and an amateur conductor of Mahler's Symphony No. 2.

Career
Kaplan was born at French Hospital in New York City on March 3, 1941, and grew up in Lawrence on Long Island. He studied at Duke University, and earned a bachelor's degree from The New School for Social Research. He later studied at New York University School of Law. In 1963, Kaplan took a job as an economist with the American Stock Exchange, at a salary of $15,000 per year. Kaplan founded the magazine Institutional Investor in 1967. He was publisher of the magazine until 1990, and editor-in-chief for two more years, although he sold it in 1984. The New York Times reported: "The price was never disclosed but was rumored to be about $75 million."

Kaplan's interest in Mahler's Symphony No 2 dated back to 1965. In 1981, he began tutelage in conducting with Charles Zachary Bornstein. He rented Avery Fisher Hall in New York for his public conducting debut in 1982, leading the American Symphony and the Westminster Symphonic Choir. Originally, the orchestra had requested that no reviews be published, but Leighton Kerner of The Village Voice breached this requested embargo with a positive review of this performance. Subsequently, Kaplan conducted Mahler's Symphony No 2 in over 100 live performances over the remainder of his life. He established the Kaplan Foundation, dedicated to scholarship and the promotion of the music of Gustav Mahler. After personal research, he twice recorded Mahler's Second Symphony: with the London Symphony Orchestra in 1987, and with the Vienna Philharmonic in 2002. Mahler's Second Symphony was the only complete work he conducted in public, although he did separately record the Adagietto from Mahler's Symphony No. 5 in a studio recording.

Kaplan owned the autograph manuscript of Mahler's score of his Second Symphony and published a facsimile edition of the score in 1986. Tim Page wrote in The New York Times: "Only now will musicians, scholars and the general public be able to own a facsimile manuscript of one of the composer's symphonies." On 29 November 2016, the manuscript was sold at auction for £4,546,250, a record for any music manuscript at the time. He also owned one of Mahler's batons and the autograph manuscript of Mahler's song, "Ich bin der Welt abhanden gekommen", part of the Rückert-Lieder. A facsimile of this manuscript was published by the Kaplan Foundation in 2015. Both manuscripts were, at one time, on deposit at the Morgan Library & Museum in New York City. He was co-editor of the new critical edition of the Second Symphony as part of the Complete Critical Edition of Mahler's works.

Kaplan's conducting attracted criticism and praise, most controversially at his December 2008 New York Philharmonic performance. Steve Smith wrote in The New York Times of this concert:

David Finlayson, a trombonist of the New York Philharmonic who performed at this concert, offered a different perspective:

In Kaplan's conducting engagements of Mahler's Symphony No 2, he did not accept a fee.

Kaplan hosted on WNYC and WQXR for more than decade the show Mad About Music until 2012 where he interviewed famous people about their love for music. He was also on the board of WNYC trustees, and in 2000 became an Evening Division faculty member at the Juilliard School.

Kaplan Foundation
Kaplan set up The Kaplan Foundation in New York City which is dedicated to the scholarship and preservation of the music of Gustav Mahler.

The Kaplan Foundation has published facsimile editions of Mahler's autograph manuscript of the Second Symphony, the Adagietto movement of the Fifth Symphony and the song, "Ich bin der Welt abhanden gekommen".

It has produced Mahler Plays Mahler, a recording using piano rolls that Mahler made of his own compositions. These rolls are the only documents that exist of Mahler as a performer.

The foundation has also published Mahler Discography (together with editor Péter Fülöp), a definitive guide to 2,774 recordings of Mahler's music; Mahler's Concerts, by Knud Martner, a compilation of the 323 known performances led by Mahler as a conductor or pianist; and The Mahler Album (editor Gilbert Kaplan), an illustrated biography containing all known photographs and a selection of drawings and sculptures of the composer.

Together with Universal Edition, the foundation is co-publisher of two scores of Mahler's Second Symphony: the New Critical Edition (editors Renate Stark-Voit and Gilbert Kaplan) and the Arrangement for Small Orchestra (by Gilbert Kaplan and Rob Mathes); and with C. F. Peters, co-publisher of the New Critical Edition of Mahler's Sixth Symphony.

Personal life
Kaplan was the younger brother of Joseph Brooks, an Academy Award-winning composer who was found dead at his New York City apartment on May 22, 2011, in an apparent suicide while under criminal indictment on multiple sexual-assault and rape counts.

Kaplan married Lena Biörck, a Swedish interior designer, in 1970. The couple had four children. Kaplan died in Manhattan, aged 74, of cancer.

Legacy
The 2022 film Tár includes an investment banker and amateur conductor named "Eliot Kaplan." Mark Swed criticized the choice, contrasting the "reptilian wannabe conductor" of the film with the real Kaplan, who he called a "kind man who died seven years ago and who cared deeply about music and people." Director Todd Field said that the character is "Kaplan in name only" and called Gilbert Kaplan "a shining example of absolute courage and inspiration."

Publications
 Gilbert E. Kaplan: "How Mahler Performed His Second Symphony". The Musical Times, Vol. 127, No. 1718 (May 1986), pp. 266–267+269+271
 Gilbert Kaplan: The Mahler Album. Kaplan Foundation in association with Thames and Hudson, New York/London 1995, ; new, expanded edition: Kaplan Foundation, New York, 2011, 
 Gilbert Kaplan: "In One Note of Mahler, a World of Meaning". The New York Times, 17 March 2002
 Gilbert Kaplan: The correct movement order in Mahler's Sixth symphony. Kaplan Foundation, New York, 2004, 
 Gustav Mahler: Symphony No. 2 in C minor : Resurrection : facsimile. Kaplan Foundation, New York, 1986, 
 Gustav Mahler: Adagietto. Facsimile, documentation, recording. Gilbert E. Kaplan, ed. Kaplan Foundation, New York, 1992,

Discography
 Gustav Mahler: Symphony No. 2 in C minor "Resurrection". Benita Valente, soprano; Maureen Forrester, alto; Gilbert E Kaplan; London Symphony Chorus.; London Symphony Orchestra. 1988
 From Mahler With Love. Gustav Mahler: Adagietto, from Symphony no. 5; Gilbert E Kaplan; London Symphony Orchestra. 1992
 Mahler plays Mahler. The Welte-Mignon piano rolls. Gilbert Kaplan, Executive Producer. 1993
 The Kaplan Mahler edition. 1996. (contains Symphony No. 2, Adagietto from Symphony No. 5, the Mahler piano rolls, recorded recollections of musicians who performed with Mahler, plus a CD-ROM part containing 150 pictures from The Mahler Album)
 Gustav Mahler: Symphony No. 2. Latonia Moore, soprano; Nadja Michael, mezzo-soprano; Gilbert Kaplan; Wiener Singverein; Wiener Philharmoniker. Deutsche Grammophon 2003

References

External links
 Interview by Marc Bridle about Mahler's 2nd Symphony, musicweb-international.com
 "Desperately seeking Mahler", The Economist

1941 births
2016 deaths
American businesspeople
American conductors (music)
American male conductors (music)
Classical music radio presenters
Juilliard School faculty
20th-century American Jews
Duke University alumni
People from The Five Towns, New York
21st-century American Jews